The 12th Magritte Awards ceremony, presented by the Académie André Delvaux, honored the best films of 2022 in Belgium. It took place on 4 March 2023, at the Théâtre National, in the historic site of Marais-Jacqmain, Brussels. During the ceremony, the Académie André Delvaux presented Magritte Awards in 23 categories. The ceremony was televised in Belgium by La Trois. Actress Lubna Azabal presided the ceremony, while director Patrick Ridremont hosted the show for the first time.

The nominees for the 12th Magritte Awards were announced on 10 February 2023. Films with the most nominations were Close with ten, followed by Zero Fucks Given with nine and Nobody Has to Know with seven. The winners were announced during the awards ceremony on 4 March 2023. Nobody Has to Know won two awards, including Best Film and Best Director for Bouli Lanners. Other multiple winners were Close with seven, Zero Fucks Given with three, and The Night of the 12th with two.

Winners and nominees

Best Film
 Nobody Has to Know
 Animals
 The Hive (La Ruche)
 Tori and Lokita (Tori et Lokita)
 Zero Fucks Given (Rien à foutre)

Best Director
 Bouli Lanners – Nobody Has to Know
 Nabil Ben Yadir – Animals
 Jean-Pierre and Luc Dardenne – Tori and Lokita (Tori et Lokita)
 Julie Lecoustre and Emmanuel Marre – Zero Fucks Given (Rien à foutre)

Best Actor
 Bouli Lanners – The Night of the 12th (La Nuit du 12)
 Aboubakr Bensaihi – Rebel
 Soufiane Chilah – Animals
 Benoît Poelvoorde – Inexorable
 Jérémie Renier – L'Ennemi

Best Actress
 Virginie Efira – Paris Memories (Revoir Paris)
 Lubna Azabal – Rebel
 Lucie Debay – Lucie Loses Her Horse (Lucie perd son cheval)
 Babetida Sadjo – Juwaa

Best Supporting Actor
 Igor Van Dessel – Close
 Mehdi Dehbi – Boy from Heaven (صبي من الجنة)
 Tijmen Govaerts – Tori and Lokita (Tori et Lokita)
 Jérémie Renier – Novembre

Best Supporting Actress
 Émilie Dequenne – Close
 Veerle Baetens – Singing Jailbirds (À l'ombre des filles)
 Anne Coesens – By Your Side (À la folie)
 Mara Taquin – Zero Fucks Given (Rien à foutre)

Most Promising Actor
 Eden Dambrine – Close
 Gustav De Waele – Close
 Gianni Guettaf – Animals
 Pablo Schils – Tori and Lokita (Tori et Lokita)

Most Promising Actress
 Sophie Breyer – The Hive (La Ruche)
 Elsa Houben – Dark Heart of the Forest (Le Cœur noir des forêts)
 Joely Mbundu – Tori and Lokita (Tori et Lokita)
 Mara Taquin – The Hive (La Ruche)

Best Screenplay
 Close – Lukas Dhont and Angelo Tijssens Animals – Nabil Ben Yadir and Antoine Cuypers
 Nobody Has to Know – Bouli Lanners
 Zero Fucks Given (Rien à foutre) – Julie Lecoustre and Emmanuel Marre

Best First Feature Film
 Zero Fucks Given (Rien à foutre) Aya
 The Hive (La Ruche)
 Yuku and the Flower of the Himalayas (Yuku et la Fleur de l'Himalaya)

Best Flemish Film
 Close
 The Eight Mountains (Le otto montagne)
 Nowhere
 Rebel

Best Foreign Film in Coproduction
 The Night of the 12th (La Nuit du 12) Clara Sola
 Madeleine Collins
 Singing Jailbirds (À l'ombre des filles)
 Where Is Anne Frank

Best Cinematography
 Close – Frank van den Eeden Inexorable – Manuel Dacosse
 Zero Fucks Given (Rien à foutre) – Olivier Boonjing

Best Production Design
 Close – Eve Martin Nobody Has to Know – Paul Rouschop
 Zero Fucks Given (Rien à foutre) – Anna Falguères

Best Costume Design
 Zero Fucks Given (Rien à foutre) – Prunelle Rulens Close – Manu Verschueren
 Nobody Has to Know – Élise Ancion

Best Original Score
 Rebel – Hannes De Maeyer, Oum, Aboubakr Bensaihi The Hive (La Ruche) – Fabian Fiorini
 Inexorable – Vincent Cahay

Best Sound
 Animals – François Aubinet, Mathieu Cox, Pierre Mertens, David Vranken, Philippe Van Leer The Night of the 12th (La Nuit du 12) – François Maurel, Olivier Mortier, Luc Thomas
 Nobody Has to Know – Marc Bastien, Thomas Gauder, Etienne Carton, Cameron Mercer, Philippe Van Leer

Best Editing
 Zero Fucks Given (Rien à foutre) – Nicolas Rumpl
 Close – Alain Dessauvage
 Nobody Has to Know – Ewin Ryckaert

Best Live Action Short Film
 'Ma Gueule – Gregory Carnol, Thibaut Wohlfahrt Drame 71 – Guillaume Lion
 Oysters (Les Huîtres) – Maïa Descamps
 Patanegra – Méryl Fortunat-Rossi

Best Animated Short Film
 Cuddle (Câline) – Margot Reumont The Big Tantrum (Grosse Colère) – Célia Tisserant and Arnaud Demuynck
 Inglorious Liaisons (Les Liaisons Foireuses) – Chloé Alliez and Violette Delvoye
 The Summer Holidays (Les Grandes Vacances) – Vincent Patar and Stéphane Aubier

Best Documentary Film
 Soy libre – Laure Portier Dreaming Walls – Amélie van Elmbt and Maya Duverdier
 Empire of Silence (L'Empire du silence) – Thierry Michel
 The End of Innocence (Petites) – Pauline Beugnies
 I Am Chance – Marc-Henri Wajnberg

Best Documentary Short Film
 Arbres – Jean-Benoît Ugeux Call It the Burning (On la nomme la brûlure) – Bénédicte Liénard and Mary Jimenez
 Dernier Voyage au Laos – Manon Saysouk
 Masks (Masques) – Olivier Smolders

Honorary Magritte Award
 Agnès Jaoui'Films with multiple nominations and awards

The following eight films received multiple nominations.

 Ten: Close Nine: Zero Fucks Given Seven: Nobody Has to Know Six: Animals Five: The Hive, Tori and Lokita Four: Rebel Three: Inexorable, The Night of the 12th Two: Singing JailbirdsThe following four films received multiple awards.
 Seven: Close Three: Zero Fucks Given Two: Nobody Has to Know, The Night of the 12th''

See also

 2022 in film
 48th César Awards
 28th Lumières Awards

References

External links
 
 

2023
2021 film awards
2022 film awards
2023 in Belgium